Chung Yeong-hwan (born 7 December 1938) is a South Korean former footballer.

References

External links
 

1938 births
Living people
South Korean footballers
Asian Games medalists in football
Footballers at the 1962 Asian Games
Kyung Hee University alumni
People from Chuncheon
Association football goalkeepers
Asian Games silver medalists for South Korea
Medalists at the 1962 Asian Games
Sportspeople from Gangwon Province, South Korea